Douglas Wardlaw (19 July 1904 – 20 May 1968) was an Australian cricketer. He played seven first-class matches for Tasmania between 1925 and 1929.

See also
 List of Tasmanian representative cricketers

References

External links
 

1904 births
1968 deaths
Australian cricketers
Tasmania cricketers
Cricketers from Hobart